Swami Vivekanand International School is a Mumbai based School. It was founded in 1995 in Gorai, Borivali, Mumbai. It is run by Swami Vivekanand Sikshan Vikas Mandal Trust. It teaches classes up to the tenth grade. The second Branch of the school is known by the name Swami Vivekanand International School & Jr. College was founded in 1998. It is situated in Kandivali, Mumbai. The Swami Vivekanand Sikshan Vikas Mandal Trust is registered under the Bombay Public Charitable Trust Act, 1950.

Alumni 
 Rohit Sharma
 Neerav Bavlecha
 Shardul Thakur

References

External links 
 

International schools in Mumbai
Junior colleges in Maharashtra
Educational institutions established in 1995
1995 establishments in Maharashtra